List of Azerbaijani Turkish exonyms in Georgia lists Azerbaijani Turkish exonyms for places in Georgia. Although most of the places are used with Georgian (Kartveli) names, they are also known with Azerbaijani Turkish exonyms especially among the Azerbaijani Turkish population.

This is the list of Azerbaijani Turkish exonyms for places in Georgia.

Georgia Gürcüstan
Tbilisi Tiflis
Abastumani Abbas-Tuman
Abkhazia Abxaziya, Abxazstan
Gali Qal
Sukhumi Suqumqala
Adjara Acarıstan
Alazani Qanıx
Alazani Valley Alazan-Həftəran vadisi, Alazan–Əyriçay vadisi
Akhalkalaki Axılkələk
Akhaltsikhe Axısqa
Batumi Batum
Debed Tona, Tana, Borçalı çayı
Javakheti Cavax
Imereti Başaçıq
Kakheti Qəxet
Khelvachauri Xelvaçavur
Kobuleti Çürüksu
Kutaisi Qutayıs
Kvemo Kartli Borçalı (According to the modern administrative division of Georgia, the territory of the historic Borçalı region roughly corresponds to the territory of the four southern municipalities of the Kvemo-Kartli region: Marneuli (Sarvan), Bolnisi (Çörük Qəmərli), Dmanisi (Başkeçid), Gardabani (Qarayazı))
Aiazmi Ayazma
Akayurta Ağayurd
Akhali-Mamudlo Yeni Mahmudlu
Akhalsheni Kərək
Akhghula, Akhghulari Ağqula, Ağqüllə
Akhkerpi Ağkörpü
Akhlo-Lalalo Axlılələ
Alavari Hallavar
Algeti Alget, Gorarxı
Amamlo Hamamlı
Ambartafa Ambartəpə
Ambarovka Ambarlı
Angrevani Əngirəvan
Araplo Araplı
Arjevan-Sarvani Ərcivan-Sarvan
Artaqla Ağtəhlə, Ağtəklə
Artsivani, Jinisi Cinis
Ashkala Aşqala
Avranlo Avranlı
Bailari Bəylər
Balakhauri Sayalıoğlu, Sisqala
Balichi Balıc, Balış
Baydari Baydar
Baytalo Baytallı
Bareti Başköy
Bediani Bədyan
Beitarafchi Bəytərəfçi
Bektakari, Bertakari Beytəkər
Beshtasheni Beşdaş, Beştaş
Bezaklo Bəzəkli
Birliki Birlik
Bolnisi Çörük Qəmərli, Bolus
Chanakhchi Çanaxçı
Chapala Qoçulu
Chivtkilisa Çiftkilisə, Cütkilsə
Cholmani Çölmən, Çölən
Chreshi Kipircik
Dagarakhlo Dağ Arıxlı
Dageti, Dagetkhachini Dağetxaçın
Damia Dəmyə
Damia-Giaurarkhi Dəmyə Görarxı
Darakoy Dərəköy
Darbazi Darboğaz
Dashbashi Daşbaşı (or Daşbaş)
Didi-Beglari Böyük Bəylər
Didi-Mughanlo Böyük Muğanlı
Dmanisi Başkeçid
Dzedzvnariani Aragöl
Dzveli-Kveshi Zol-Göyəç
Fakhralo Faxralı
Ganakhleba Anbarlı
Gantiadi Qalamşa
Gardabani Qarayazı, Qaratəpə
Gedagdaghi Gödəkdağ
Gedaklari Gödəklər
Geta Aşağı Güləver
Gora Canbağça
Gulbaghi Güllübağ
Gumbati Gümbət
Jandari Candar
Jankoshi Canxoş
Javshaniani Abdallı
Iakublo Yaquflu, Yaqublu
Ilmazlo İlməzli
Imiri İmir
Irganchey Yırğançay
Itsria Qaradaşlı
Kaburi Qabur
Kakliani Gəyliyən
Kamarlo Kəmərli
Kamishlo Qamışlı
Karajalari, Karajala Qaracalar
Kariani Çopurallar
Kasumlo Qasımlı
Kazreti Xəzəret
Kesalo Kosalı
Keshalo Keşəli
Khidiskuri Həsənxocalı
Kirikhlo Qırıxlı
Kirach-Mughanlo Çıraq-Muğanlı
Kirovka Mamey
Kizilajlo Qızılhacılı
Kizilkilisa Qızıl-Kilisə, Qızıl-Kilsə
Khakhalajvari Dəmirli
Khachkov Xaçköy
Khanji-Gazlo Xancığazlı
Khataveti Mollaəhmədli
Khojorni Xocornu
Khutor-Lejbadini Xutor-Lejbəddin, Xutor-Lecbəddin
Kokhta Axalıq
Kosalari Kosalar
Kushchi, (Marneuli Municipality) Quşçu
Kushchi, (Tsalka Municipality) Quşçu
Kvemo-Arkevani Aşağı Qoşakilsə
Kvemo-Bolnisi Kəpənəkçi, Bolus Kəpənəkçisi
Kvemo-Kharaba Aşağı Xaraba, Neon-Xaraba
Kvemo-Kulari Aşağı Qullar
Kvemo-Orozmani Aşağı Oruzman
Kvemo-Sarali Aşağı Saral
Lejbadini Lejbəddin, Lecbəddin
Mamishlo Məmişli
Mamkhuti Saraçlı
Manglisi Məngli
Marneuli Sarvan, Marneul
Mashavera Qoruncuq
Meore-Kesalo İkinci Kosalı
Mtisdziri Suqala
Mtskneti Əsmələr
Mukhrana Daşdıqullar, Daşlıqullar
Mushevani Dəllər
Nakhiduri Arıxlı, Aran Arıxlı
Nardevani Nərdivan
Nazarlo Nəzərli
Oliangi Öləng
Pantiani Armudlu
Patara-Beglari Bala Bəylər
Patara-Darbazi Bala Darvaz
Pirveli-Kesalo Birinci Kosalı
Parizi Bala Muğanlı
Poladauri Çatax
Ponichala Soğanlıq
Potskhveriani Babakişilər
Rustavi Bostandərə
Sabechisi Qaraköm
Sabereti Qaratikan
Sadakhlo Sadaxlı
Sagdrioni Yeddikilisə, Yeddikilsə
Sakire Qaşqatala
Samadlo Səmədli
Sameba Günyaqala
Samtredo Cəfərli
Samtsevrisi Şəmşiöyü
Saparlo Səfərli
Sarkineti Dəmirbulaq
Sartichala Sərtiçala
Savaneti İmirhəsən
Seidkhojalo Seyidqocalı
Senebi Sənab
Shaumiani Şüləver
Shikhilo Şıxlı
Shipiaki Şipək
Shua-Bolnisi İncəoğlu
Soghutlo Söyüdlü
Sopeli Bolnisi Xaçın
Talaveri Faxralı
Tamarisi Traubenberq, Traunbenberg
Tandzia Tağılı
Tarsoni Tərson
Tazakendi Təzəkənd
Tazakharaba Təzəxaraba, Təzə-Xaraba
Tejisi Təcis
Tekali Təkəli
Tetritsqaro Ağbulaq
Tikilisa Təkkilisə, Təkkilsə, Təkilisə
Tkispiri Boğazkəsən, Meşəağzı
Tnusi Dunus
Tsalka Barmaqsız
Tsopi Sop
Tsipori Yuxarı Güləver
Tsurtavi Kolagir
Ulashlo Ulaşlı
Vake Qarakilisə, Qarakilsə
Vanati Mığırlı
Zemo-Arkevani Yuxarı Qoşakilsə
Zemo-Karabulakhi Yuxarı Qarabulaq
Zemo-Kulari Yuxarı Qullar
Zemo-Orozmani Yuxarı Oruzman
Zemo-Sarali Yuxarı Saral
Lazeti (Lazona) Lazıstan
Mskhaldidi Armudlar, Sxəldi, Sxaltı
Poti Faş
Redoubt Kali Redut Qala, Redutqala
Sagarejo Qaraçöp (Qaraçöp is one of the parts of Sagarejo where live Azerbaijani Turks. It includes 8 Azerbaijani Turkish villages:)
Duzagrama Düzəyrəm, Əyrəm
Iormughanlo Muğanlı
Kazlari Qazlar
Keshalo Keşəli
Lambalo Ləmbəli
Paldo Baldoy, Baldo
Tulari Tüllər
Tsitsmatiani Qarabağlı, Qaramanlı
Samegrelo Meqrelistan
Shekvetili Şövkət El, Şövkət İl, Şövkətel, Şövkətil
Signagi Sığnaq
South Osetia Cənubi Osetiya, Güney Osetiya
Tskhinvali Şinval, Tsxinval
Tsikhisdziri Çömbərli, Qarahəsəli
Tsodoreti Codoret
Zvareti Sarallar

See also
List of Azerbaijani Turkish exonyms

References 

Georgia
Azerbaijani Turkish exonyms in Georgia
Azerbaijani Turkish